"Time Sandwich" is the thirty-third episode from the fifth season of the American animated television series Adventure Time. Its original air date on Cartoon Network was September 9, 2013. The episode was written by Kent Osborne and Cole Sanchez and directed by Elizabeth Ito, from a story by Osborne, Pendleton Ward, Jack Pendarvis, and Adam Muto. Tom Kenny lent the voice of Magic Man, the episode's antagonist.

In this episode, Finn, Jake, Princess Bubblegum and Marceline the Vampire Queen struggle to retrieve Jake's sandwich that Magic Man steals. Magic Man tells a riddle that would allow them to retrieve it but summons a bubble that decelerates himself in time. Inspiration for the story was found in a popular video of Paula Deen preparing a sandwich in slow motion. Approximately two million viewers saw it on the original air date. Reviews were positive of its visuals and comic aspects, especially following a succession of episodes that were perceived as more serious.

Plot
Jake prepares a sandwich that he has been anxious to make all day. As soon as he completes it, with Finn and their robot BMO (Niki Yang) present in the room, Magic Man (Kenny) appears and steals the sandwich. Magic Man offers the sandwich back to him if he is able to solve a riddle. Jake insults his riddle, prompting Magic Man to fall from their house. Magic Man summons a bubble that decelerates time, allowing him to slow his descent.

Finn and Jake partially enter the bubble, where five hours elapse in real time. BMO claims to compute the solution for Finn and Jake, but BMO has the two build a ramp so that the robot looks cool skateboarding in the bubble. Finn calls Bubblegum for help as Jake tries to make a new sandwich. Bubblegum explains to Finn that the bubble uses molasses at room temperature to decelerate its contents, and that a "molasses warmer" would reverse the effect. The warmer detonates in the bubble, but it explodes at the same slow rate.

With no more ideas, Bubblegum calls Marceline for help. Marceline assures Jake, unable to make an equivalent sandwich, that she will help retrieve his sandwich, but she too becomes stuck in the bubble. Jake enters the bubble out of desperation, pouting, and is able to move at a normal pace. The rest figure this to be part of Magic Man's riddle, but Finn has to remind Jake to continue being sad as he runs. Jake thinks of Mr. Cupcake (Dee Bradley Baker) gaining the affections of Lady Rainicorn (Yang), Jake's lover, following his death, making Jake angry. Finn tells him to think of sad thoughts instead; Jake imagines Mr. Cupcake mourning Jake's death and the two reconciling, making Jake cry and allowing him to reach Magic Man in time. Marcy kicks him in the groin and BMO rolls over him. Jake wins back the sandwich, and the bubble bursts. The episode ends with Jake lying on the ground crying happily. He finally takes a bite of his sandwich, while blubbering "So so good..."

Production
"Time Sandwich" was written by Kent Osborne and Cole Sanchez. As part of a team responsible for sequencing scenes, Osborne and Sanchez adapted the episode from a story previously devised by series creator Pendleton Ward, Jack Pendarvis, Adam Muto, and Osborne. The episode was directed by Elizabeth Ito, her seventh credit for the season. Art direction was handled by Nick Jennings. According to Osborne, the story for "Time Sandwich" was inspired by a widely circulated video of celebrity chef Paula Deen preparing a sandwich. The video, which has been slowed down, grew popular for enhancing the tension and absurdity of her preoccupation with making the sandwich. Osborne argued that the episode has "a crazy story featuring almost all of the regular characters, but the goal is super simple". Sanchez expressed enjoyment at having written the episode, calling it "crazy fun to work on." He specifically praised Osborne's work, arguing that his scenes were consistently hilarious.

The central plot to "Time Sandwich" revolves around the antics of Magic Man. The character was introduced in the first-season episode "Freak City" is his first, and reappeared in the fourth-season episode "Sons of Mars" and the earlier fifth-season episode "All the Little People". Magic Man is voiced by Tom Kenny, who also voices the Ice King on the series.

Broadcast and reception
"Time Sandwich" originally aired on Cartoon Network on September 9, 2013. This airing earned a Nielsen rating of 1.3, in that 1.3 percent of families with a television set watched the episode on that date. The rating represents approximately two million viewers, the network's third most-viewed airing for the second week in September.

"Time Sandwich" earned positive reviews. Oliver Sava, writing for The A.V. Club, gave the episode a B+ grade, remarking that the deceleration of time juxtaposed with the fast pace inherent to the episode. He called the episode funny and described that as a pleasant shift from the preceding episodes, which dealt with poignant themes and characters. Sava praised the illustrations in the episode, especially that of the time bubble. Eric Kohn wrote that the episode was "beguiling" and "cockamamie" for IndieWire Daily. Nicolas Michaud, writing in his book Adventure Time and Philosophy, called the episode metaphysical in its contrasting of science and magic. He regarded Bubblegum's role in the episode as corroborating her as the "staunchest proponent and defender" of the scientific method. TV.com's staff found the comical aspects excellent, as were the visuals. In particular, the staff called BMO riding the skateboard in front of Marceline the best image the show had accomplished. John Moe and Open Mike Eagle, in Conversation Parade: An Adventure Time Podcast, observed that fans held the episode as the best introduction to Adventure Time.

Explanatory notes

References

Citations

External links
 
 

2013 American television episodes
Adventure Time (season 5) episodes